Robert Krasker, B.S.C., A.S.C. (21 August 1913 – 16 August 1981) was an Australian cinematographer who worked on more than 50 films in his career.

Krasker was born in Alexandria, Egypt but his birth was registered in Perth, Western Australia. He travelled to England in 1937 via photographic studios in Paris and Dresden, and found work at Alexander Korda's London Films, where he became a senior camera operator. His first film as a director of photography was The Gentle Sex (1943), directed by Leslie Howard.

Krasker's work was influenced by film noir and German Expressionism. He received an Academy Award for his work on The Third Man (1949), directed by Carol Reed, having previously worked with Reed on Odd Man Out (1947). He also worked on Brief Encounter for David Lean and Another Man's Poison for Irving Rapper.

Lean sacked him from Great Expectations in December 1946 because both he and producer Ronald Neame were unhappy with his handling of the marsh scenes. However he is credited with the opening scene of that film. His later films included the epics Alexander the Great, El Cid, and The Fall of the Roman Empire.

He returned to Australia in the 1950s  and reviewed movies.

His legacy during his lifetime was relatively unknown in Australia, and some of his photographs were sold after his death in London.
His death in 1981, was noted by Australian film directors of the time.

Krasker was the first Australian cinematographer to win an Oscar; the second won in 1990.

Notes

External links 
 
 

1913 births
1981 deaths
Australian cinematographers
Best Cinematographer Academy Award winners
People from Perth, Western Australia
People from Alexandria